Ranis is a town in the Saale-Orla-Kreis district, in Thuringia, Germany. It is situated 15 km east of Saalfeld, and 30 km south of Jena.

Demographics

Historical population 
(As of 31 December 1994):

References

Towns in Thuringia
Saale-Orla-Kreis